James Ray Hines  (born September 10, 1946) is a former American track and field athlete and National Football League (NFL) player, who held the 100-meter world record for 15 years. In 1968, he became the first man to officially break the 10-second barrier in the 100 meters, and won individual and relay gold at the Mexico City Olympics.

Track career
Born in Dumas, Arkansas, Hines was raised in Oakland, California and graduated from McClymonds High School in 1964. He was a baseball player in his younger years until he was spotted by track coach Jim Coleman as a running talent, and Hines became a sprinter. At the 1968 US national championships in Sacramento, California, Hines became the first man to break the ten second barrier in the 100-meter race, setting 9.9 (manual timing), with an electronic time of 10.03 – two other athletes, Ronnie Ray Smith behind him (electronic time 10.13) and Charles Greene on the other semi-final (electronic time 10.09) having the same official clocking. That evening of June 20, 1968, at Hughes Stadium has been dubbed by track and field historians as the "Night of Speed." Hines attended Texas Southern University in Houston, Texas. He was a member of the Texas Southern University Tigers track team.

A few months later, at the 1968 Summer Olympics, Hines—a black athlete—found himself in a tense situation, with racial riots going on in his home country and a threat of a boycott by the black athletes of the US team, who were disturbed by the controversial idea of admitting apartheid South Africa to the Games and revelations linking the head of the International Olympic Committee, Avery Brundage, to a racist and anti-semitic country club. 
Hines reached the 100 m final, and won it with the time 9.89 appearing at the screen, later corrected to 9.95. The 9.89 was taken from a light beam across the finish line, while the official photographic process used Polaroid film and took a couple of minutes to process and read. 
There was some controversy over how his (slower appearing) automatic time of 9.95 should compare to the hand timed 9.9 world record (Hines was again recorded at 9.9  in his 9.95 race).  Automatic times start instantly with the sound of the gun, while hand times include human reaction time to start the watch.  It took until 1977 before fully automatic timing was required of world records. As the fastest electronic time to that point, Hines' mark was recognized exclusively as a new world record. The race was also significant for being the third all-black podium in Olympic history. Hines helped break another world record, when he and his teammates sprinted to the 4 × 100 m relay gold at the same Games.

Football career
After these successes, Hines was a 6th-round pick in the 1968 NFL Draft by the Miami Dolphins, an American football team. Hines did not have the football skills to match his speed and spent the 1968 season on the practice squad. He was given the nickname "Oops" due to his lack of football skill. He appeared in ten games with Miami in 1969 catching two passes for 23 yards, rushed the ball one time for seven yards and returned one kickoff for 22 yards. Hines then appeared in one game with the Kansas City Chiefs in 1970. He never played pro football again.  He has one of the top 100-meter times by NFL players. Hines was ranked the 10th-worst NFL player of all time by Deadspin writer Jeff Pearlman.

Later years
For years Hines worked with inner-city youth in Houston, as well as on oil rigs outside the city.

Hines's world record remained unbeaten until Calvin Smith ran 9.93, also at altitude, in July 1983.

He was inducted into the Texas Track and Field coaches Hall of Fame, class of 2016.

References

External links

Official Website

Jim Hines wins the 1968 Olympics men's 100 meters final in 9.95 seconds via the Olympic Channel on YouTube

1946 births
Living people
People from Dumas, Arkansas
American male sprinters
African-American male track and field athletes
Athletes (track and field) at the 1968 Summer Olympics
Olympic gold medalists for the United States in track and field
Medalists at the 1968 Summer Olympics
World record setters in athletics (track and field)
Texas Southern University alumni
American football wide receivers
Miami Dolphins players
Kansas City Chiefs players
Players of American football from Arkansas
Track and field athletes from Arkansas
Players of American football from Oakland, California
Track and field athletes from Oakland, California
Track and field athletes in the National Football League
USA Outdoor Track and Field Championships winners
21st-century African-American people
20th-century African-American sportspeople